Jairo Luis Blumer (born December 31, 1986 in Campinas), or simply Jairo, is a Brazilian defensive midfielder who plays for Votuporanguense.

Honours
Brazilian Cup: 2005

Contract
Paulista 1 January 2008 to 31 December 2008
Atlético-PR 30 June 2007 to 30 June 2010

External links
CBF

1986 births
Living people
Brazilian footballers
Club Athletico Paranaense players
Paulista Futebol Clube players
Vila Nova Futebol Clube players
Grêmio Barueri Futebol players
Guaratinguetá Futebol players
Mirassol Futebol Clube players
Brazilian people of German descent
J2 League players
Kyoto Sanga FC players
Clube Atlético Votuporanguense players
Brazilian expatriate footballers
Expatriate footballers in Japan
Association football midfielders
Sportspeople from Campinas